Oklahoma Baptist Homes for Children (OBHC) provides homes for children affected by abuse, abandonment, neglect, or poverty. Founded in 1903 as an orphan's home, the Baptist Homes for Children is a family-style residential care facility with eight children residing in cottages on four campuses across the state.

Public schools and local Southern Baptist churches assist in educational and religious goals. Houseparents provide a family atmosphere and training.

Oklahoma Baptist Homes for Children is the largest provider of private, not-for-profit, residential childcare in the state of Oklahoma, United States. The organization operates solely on private donations and contributions and does not accept any state or federal funding.

OBHC has four residential care campuses:
 Baptist Children's Home, Oklahoma City
 Boys Ranch Town, Edmond
 Baptist Children's Home, Owasso
 Baptist Home for Girls, Madill

Maternity/Parenting Services
 Adolescent maternity home
 Program for parenting girls
 Program for single mothers

Hope Pregnancy Ministries
OBHC offers seven crisis pregnancy centers; two in Oklahoma City, one in Edmond, one in Ardmore, one in Alva, one in Shawnee, and one in Tulsa.

Oklahoma Baptist Homes for Children is an affiliate corporation of the Baptist General Convention of Oklahoma.

References

External links
 Oklahoma Baptist Homes for Children: Oklahoma Baptist Homes for Children
 Oklahoma City Campus Annual Miles4Smiles Bike Ride: Miles4Smiles
 Pregnancy Resource Network: Pregnancy Resource Network
 Hope Pregnancy Ministries: Think I'm Pregnant
 Baptist General Convention of Oklahoma: Baptist General Convention of Oklahoma
 CORE: Oklahoma Baptist Homes for Children - CORE Member

Orphanages in the United States
Children's charities based in the United States
Non-profit organizations based in Oklahoma
Child abuse-related organizations
Residential buildings in Oklahoma
Organizations established in 1903
1903 establishments in Oklahoma Territory